Richard Rock (1690? – 1777) was a British physician.

Richard Rock may also refer to:

 Richard Rock (long jumper) (born 1967), Canadian long jumper
 Richard Rock (javelin thrower), Barbadian javelin thrower and medalist at the 1999 Central American and Caribbean Championships in Athletics
 Dickie Rock, Irish singer
 Richard Rock (Kansas politician) (1924–2013), Kansas state legislator
 Rand Rock (Richard Rand Rock II, 1949–2013), his son, member of the Kansas House of Representatives

See also
Rick Rock, American record producer